Sulabast (also Romanized as Sūlābast and Soolabast; also known as Sūlāvas and Sulāwās) is a village in Doreh Rural District, in the Central District of Sarbisheh County, South Khorasan Province, Iran. At the 2006 census, its population was 154, in 32 families.

References 

Populated places in Sarbisheh County